Gábor Bardi (born 13 May 1982) is a Hungarian former professional footballer who played as a forward.

Career
Bardi signed with Jászapáti on 23 May 2012, after an impressive season with Eger in the Nemzeti Bajnokság II, becoming top goalscorer as well as captaining the team to the title and promotion.

References

External links
Player profile at Bőcs 
Player profile at HLSZ 

1982 births
Living people
People from Kisvárda
Hungarian footballers
Association football forwards
Vasas SC players
Nyíregyháza Spartacus FC players
Paksi FC players
Bőcs KSC footballers
Szolnoki MÁV FC footballers
Sportspeople from Szabolcs-Szatmár-Bereg County